Nalepa may refer to:

People
 Alfred Nalepa (1856–1929), German zoologist
 Irena Nalepa (born 1951), Polish biochemist
 Michał Nalepa (footballer, born 1993), Polish football player
 Michał Nalepa (footballer, born 1995), Polish football player
 Maciej Nalepa (born 1978), Polish football player
 Tadeusz Nalepa (1943–2007), Polish composer, guitar player, vocalist and lyricist

Places
 Nalepa, Łódź Voivodeship, a settlement in the administrative district of Gmina Czastary, within Wieruszów County, Łódź Voivodeship, Poland

See also